Melanocercops melanommata is a moth of the family Gracillariidae. It is known from Queensland, Australia.

References

Acrocercopinae
Moths described in 1913